Rotundo is an Italian surname. Notable people with the surname include:

Carmelina Rotundo (born 1953), Italian journalist
David Rotundo (fl. 1991- ), Canadian blues musician
Margaret Rotundo (born 1949), American politician
Massimo Rotundo (born 1955), Italian comics artist

Italian-language surnames